WDBF-LP, branded as 103.5 Brave Nation, is a radio station licensed to Decatur, Indiana broadcasting from the Hoosier Pattern Studio located in Bellmont High School. The station broadcasts a classic rock format at 103.5 on the FM dial.

History
WDBF-LP was constructed over the summer of 2016 primarily by Jovan Mrvos, a former radio DJ in the Chicago area. The station is constructed inside of Bellmont High School and broadcasts from the nearby administrative building on the campus of Bellmont High School.

The radio station, branded as 103.5 Brave Nation, is almost completely run by students. On the weekends, the station features various shows such as syndicated Pink Floyd program "Floydian Slip."

References

External links
 

DBF-LP
Radio stations established in 2016
2016 establishments in Indiana
DBF-LP